1930 Sultan Hussein Cup Final, was the final match of the 1929–30 Sultan Hussein Cup, was between Tersana and El-Mokhtalat (Zamalek SC now), Tersana won the match 1–0.

Route to the final

 1  Ithad Withdrew, Victory was awarded to El-Mokhtalat.

Match details

See also
 Sultan Hussein Cup

References

External links
 http://www.angelfire.com/ak/EgyptianSports/ZamalekInSultanCup.html#1930

SHC 1930
SHC 1930